Professional Fighters League (formerly the World Series of Fighting, or "WSOF") is an American mixed martial arts promotion, and the following is a history of its champions in each weight class. As well as championship history for their International promotions WSOF: Canada and WSOF Global Championship.

PFL Tournament champions

2018

2019

2021

2022

Men's Championship history (defunct)

All WSOF Championships were retired and vacated on June 7, 2018, when the PFL league format began at PFL 1. The PFL crowns seasonal champions as an alternative to recognizing a single lineal champion.

Heavyweight Championship
206 to 265 lbs (93 to 120 kg)

Light Heavyweight Championship
186 to 205 lbs (84 to 93 kg)

Middleweight Championship
171 to 185 lbs (77 to 84 kg)

Welterweight Championship
156 to 170 lbs (70 to 77 kg)

Lightweight Championship
146 to 155 lbs (66 to 70 kg)

Featherweight Championship
136  to 145 lbs (61 to 66 kg)

Bantamweight Championship
126 to 135 lbs (57 to 61 kg)

Flyweight Championship
116 to 125 lbs (53 to 57 kg)

Women's Championship history (defunct)

All WSOF Championships were retired and vacated on June 7, 2018 when the PFL league format began at PFL 1. The PFL crowns seasonal champions as an alternative to recognizing a single lineal champion.

Women's Strawweight Championship
106 to 115 lb (48 to 52 kg)

Symbolic Titles

All WSOF International Championships were retired and vacated on June 7, 2018 when the PFL league format began at PFL 1. The PFL crowns seasonal champions as an alternative to recognizing a single lineal champion.

Canadian Welterweight Championship
156 to 170 lbs (70 to 77 kg)

Global Heavyweight Championship
206 to 265 lbs (93 to 120 kg)

Global Flyweight Championship
125 lbs (57 kg)

WSOF Tournament champions

Records

Most wins in title bouts
The following includes all fighters with three or more championship and/or interim championship title fights. Fighters with the same number of title wins are arranged in order of most title bouts. Tournament championships are not included.

Most consecutive title defenses
The following includes all WSOF champions who were able to consecutively defend their title two times or more. Fighters with the same number of title defenses are listed chronologically.

Multi-division champions

Fighters who have won championships in multiple weight classes. Tournament champions are not included.

Simultaneous two division champions

Champions by nationality
Fighters with multiple title reigns in a specific division will be counted once in the Division champions. Interim champions who have never become linear champions will be listed as interim champions.

See also
 List of PFL events
 List of current WSOF fighters
 List of current WSOF-Global fighters
 List of current mixed martial arts champions
 List of Bellator MMA champions
 List of EliteXC champions
 List of Invicta FC champions
 List of ONE Championship champions
 List of Pride champions
 List of Strikeforce champions
 List of UFC champions
 List of WEC champions
 Mixed martial arts weight classes

References

champions
PFL